Abraham Haskel Taub (February 1, 1911 – August 9, 1999) was a distinguished American mathematician and physicist, well known for his important contributions to the early development of general relativity, as well as differential geometry and differential equations.

Work
In a 1948 paper dealing with relativistic shock waves, Taub introduced a relativistic generalization of the Rankine-Hugoniot jump conditions across a shock, which is now known as the Taub Adiabat. He also introduced the Taub–NUT space in general relativity.

Taub graduated in 1931 with a bachelor's degree in mathematics and physics from the University of Chicago. He earned his doctorate at Princeton University in 1935, under the direction of the prominent relativist Howard P. Robertson.  At Princeton, Taub was also influenced by Oswald Veblen. After a postdoctoral year at the Institute for Advanced Study, Taub became an assistant professor at the University of Washington in Seattle.

In 1948, Abe Taub went to the University of Illinois as the chief mathematician associated with a project to build a computer based on von Neumann's plans. The computer, called ORDVAC, was completed in 1952 and delivered to the Aberdeen Proving Ground. A second copy of the computer, ILLIAC I, remained at Illinois and was the prototype for several other computers. Taub was head of the Digital Computer Laboratory at Illinois from 1961 until 1964, when he moved to the University of California, Berkeley, as director of the Computer Center (1964–68) with a joint appointment in the department of mathematics. He was a full time professor of mathematics from 1967 to 1978, when he retired as professor emeritus.

Upon his death he was survived by his widow, three children, and a grandchild.

References

External links 
 
 Biography of Taub at Princeton
 Interview of Taub and others about their experiences at Princeton

1911 births
1999 deaths
20th-century American mathematicians
20th-century American physicists
Differential geometers
American relativity theorists
Mathematicians from Illinois
Scientists from Chicago
University of Chicago alumni
Princeton University alumni
University of Washington faculty
University of Illinois Urbana-Champaign faculty
University of California, Berkeley faculty
Fellows of the American Physical Society